The Battle of Forum Julii was fought between the armies of the rival Roman emperors Otho and Vitellius forces in early 69 AD. It is described by Tacitus in his Histories at 2.14-15. The exact location of this battle is not mentioned by the historian, however, he alludes to its taking place in Gallia Narbonensis, possibly near modern Fréjus.

Prelude 
After assuming the imperial throne during the civil war, Otho campaigned to secure the passes in the Alps bordering Gaul, as well as those territories whose loyalties toward him were in doubt. As a part of these campaigns, he sent his fleet to secure Gallia Narbonensis, which had sworn allegiance to Vitellius, Otho's primary opposition, and potential (and later successful) usurper of the throne.

According to Tacitus (Histories 2.14), Fabius Valens, after hearing of the threat to Gallia Narbonensis, responded as follows:

Battle 
The battle began as soon as the armies met. A rash attack on behalf of the Vitellian auxiliaries led to them being surrounded:

Despite the loss, the Vitellianist forces, specifically the fierce Tungrian auxiliaries, retaliated against their enemy, who had relaxed in the joy of victory (Histories 2.15):

Aftermath 
The Vitellianists retreated to Antipolis, a town of Gallia Narbonensis, the Othonianists to Albigaunum, in Upper Liguria, who subsequently blockaded the province from unfriendly forces.

When Fabius Valens heard of the loss, he sent a detachment of Batavian auxiliaries to the relief of the province. Tacitus makes a note of this action (Histories 2.28) with an anecdote on the well-known strength of the Batavians, and the subsequent risings of a mutiny on behalf of the Vitellianist legions.  Due to the feeling of fear/loss that the legions had when these brave compatriots of theirs were sent away for the aforementioned mission, Valens was forced to deal with said brief mutiny of his troops.

Forum Julii
Forum Iulii
69
Forum Julii
Year of the Four Emperors
1st century in Roman Gaul
Gallia Narbonensis